Miniatures is the fifth studio album by Nekropolis, working under the moniker Nekropolis, released in 1989 by Nekropolis.

Track listing

Personnel 
Adapted from the Miniatures liner notes.
Peter Frohmader – bass guitar, sampler, synthesizer

Release history

References 

1989 albums
Nekropolis albums